Miguel Heidemann (born 27 January 1998) is a German professional racing cyclist, who currently rides for UCI Continental team . He won a gold medal in the mixed team relay event at the 2020 European Road Championships.

Major results
2019
 1st  Time trial, National Under-23 Road Championships
 1st Mountains classification Istrian Spring Trophy
 10th G.P. Palio del Recioto
2020
 1st  Team relay, UEC European Road Championships
 1st  Time trial, National Under-23 Road Championships
 10th Overall Tour of Antalya
2021
 2nd  Team relay, UEC European Road Championships
 2nd Time trial, National Road Championships
 9th Overall Istrian Spring Trophy
 10th Chrono des Nations

References

External links
 

1998 births
Living people
German male cyclists
Sportspeople from Trier
Cyclists from Rhineland-Palatinate